Ramadan Abdullah Mohammed Shalah (1 January 1958 – 6 June 2020) was the leader of Palestinian Islamic Jihad (PIJ) between 27 October 1995 and 2018. 

PIJ has been designated a terrorist organisation by the United States, the European Union, the United Kingdom, Japan, Canada, Australia, New Zealand and Israel. 

On becoming secretary-general of PIJ, Shalah was designated a Specially Designated Terrorist (SDT) by the United States on 27 November 1995. In 2006, he was placed on the United States FBI Most Wanted Terrorists list. 

In April 2018, Shalah suffered a series of strokes, and on 28 September 2018 was replaced by Ziyad al-Nakhalah as PIJ leader. 

During the 23 years of his leadership of PIJ, the group undertook numerous attacks on Israeli civilians, including suicide bombings; and has suffered extensive operations against its infrastructure carried out by the IDF, which resulted in severe losses to the group, and it appeared significantly weakened by 2004.

Early life
Shalah was born in Shuja'iyya, also called Gaza Sejaiya district, a neighborhood in eastern Gaza City.

Shalah earned a Ph.D. in banking and economics from the University of Durham, England. His 1989-thesis was entitled Islamic banking in an interest-based economy : a case study of Jordan.

Professor Sami Al-Arian helped bring Shalah to Al-Arian's university, the University of South Florida, in Tampa, Florida, where Shalah taught as an adjunct professor, and where he was appointed by Al-Arian as head of WISE. Shalah left in 1995 to head PIJ.

Al-Arian would later plead guilty to helping PIJ, and was sentenced to 57 months in prison. Al-Arian said he was shocked to learn Shalah was "anything other than a scholar."

Palestinian Islamic Jihad activity
Shalah became secretary-general of PIJ in 1995, after the assassination of its previous leader, Fathi Shiqaqi in Malta. On becoming secretary-general of PIJ, Shalah was designated a Specially Designated Terrorist by the United States on 27 November 1995.

Along with fellow PIJ member, Abd Al Aziz Awda, Shalah was indicted in a 53 count indictment in the United States District Court for the Middle District of Florida, Tampa, Florida, on Racketeer Influenced and Corrupt Organizations Act (RICO) charges of alleged involvement in racketeering activities for Palestinian Islamic Jihad, a US designated international terrorist organization. Shalah was wanted for conspiracy to conduct the affairs of the PIJ through a pattern of racketeering activities such as bombings, murders, extortion, and money laundering.

For that indictment, Shalah then became one of six alleged and indicted terrorist fugitives among the second and most recent group of indicted fugitives to be added to the United States FBI Most Wanted Terrorists list on 24 February 2006, along with Abd Al Aziz Awda. They were wanted for conspiracy to conduct the affairs of the designated international terrorist organization, known as the "Palestinian Islamic Jihad".

Death
Shalah died on 6 June 2020 in Lebanon after a long illness that included two years in a coma. His funeral was held in Damascus and was attended by, among others the head of the PIJ movement who replaced him, Ziyad al-Nakhalah.

Books
His writings include:
Iqtiṣādīyāt al-mālīyah al-ʻāmmah wa-al-niẓām al-mālī fī al-Islām, al-Jāmiʻāt al-Islāmiyah, 1984, 359 p. On Islamic economics, particularly public finance.
al-Gharb wa-al-ṣirāʻ ʻalá Filasṭīn fī al-qarn al-ḥādī wa-al-ʻishrīn, Markaz Filasṭīn lil-Dirāsāt wa-al-Buḥūth, 1999, 35 p. On the West when it comes to the Palestinian struggle.
Fī ʻayn al-ʻāṣifah : al-ḥiwār al-hāmm wa-al-shāmil alladhī ajratʹhu ṣaḥīfat al-Ḥayāh al-Landanīyah maʻa Amīn ʻĀmm Ḥarakat al-Jihād al-Islāmī fī Filasṭīn al-Duktūr Ramaḍān ʻAbd Allāh Shallaḥ, Bisan, 2003, 112 p. Interviews.

References

External links
 FBI's Most Wanted Terrorists wanted poster of Shalah 
 Rewards for Justice wanted poster of Shalah from US State Dept., similar to the preceding

1958 births
2020 deaths
Alumni of Durham University
FBI Most Wanted Terrorists
Fugitives
Fugitives wanted by the United States
Fugitives wanted on organised crime charges
Fugitives wanted on terrorism charges
Islamic Jihad Movement in Palestine members
Palestinian Islamists
Leaders of Islamic terror groups
People convicted of racketeering
People from Gaza City
University of South Florida faculty
Zagazig University alumni